Argyrosaurus is a genus of titanosaurian sauropod dinosaur that lived about 70 million years ago, during the Late Cretaceous Period of what is now Argentina.

Discovery and naming

The type species, Argyrosaurus superbus, was formally described by Richard Lydekker in 1893.

The holotype specimen of Argyrosaurus superbus is a huge left forelimb, MLP 77-V-29-1. found at Chico River, a Campanian/Maastrichtian horizon in the Lago Colhué Huapi Formation. The material includes the humerus, ulna, radius, and all five metacarpals. Recent stratigraphic information from the Lago Colhue Huapi Formation has the area that the holotype was collected from being a more probable early late Maastrichtian age instead of early Coniacian.

When discovered, the forelimb was apparently a part of a complete skeleton, however, during excavation the rest of the remains were completely destroyed. In the same publication, Lydekker assigned a partial left femur from Chubut Province, MLP 21, to Argyrosaurus but he did not explain his reasoning why he thought the femur was referable to the genus. He also assigned two caudal vertebra centra, MLP 22, from the Santa Cruz Province. After these specimens, other remains were found, including other limb bones, a clavicle, a pubic bone and some tail vertebrae that were referred to the same genus.

A complete right femur FMNH 13019 and left tibia FMNH 13020 from Chubut Province were originally referred to Antarctosaurus by Von Huene in 1929, however, in 2003 Jaime Eduardo Powell tentatively referred them to cf. Argyrosaurus.

In 1979 Bonaparte and Gasparini referred a partial skeleton, PLV 4628/MACN-CH 217, which included limb material and several vertebrae  from Chubut Province to Argyrosaurus.

Although these numerous other remains have been referred, in 2012 Philip Mannion and Alejandro Otero considered the holotype remains the only material which unambiguously pertains to the genus. Many of the referred specimens either have no overlapping material, lack key features in the holotype, or were not illustrated making not possible to assign them without being restudied. Most of the referred specimens were considered indeterminate titanosaurs. They also considered one of the referred specimens, the partial skeleton PLV 4628/MACN-CH 217, to be its own genus which they called Elaltitan.

The genus name means 'silver lizard' from Greek argyros, 'silver', and sauros, 'lizard', because it was discovered in Argentina, which literally means 'silver land'. The specific epithet means "proud" in Latin.

Description

It is distinguished from other genera by particularly high and short vertebral arches. Ulna and radius were robust, the metacarpal bones were long as with representatives of the Macronaria. Humerus shows a rectangular upper end, similar to the titanosaurs Saltasaurus and Opisthocoelicaudia. An important feature that confirms the classification within the Titanosauria is a pronounced bone spike at the upper end of ulna.

References

External links 

 An image of Argyrosaurus
 Artist's impression of Argyrosaurus, with scaled holotype forelimb

Lithostrotians
Late Cretaceous dinosaurs of South America
Cretaceous Argentina
Fossils of Argentina
Golfo San Jorge Basin
Fossil taxa described in 1893
Taxa named by Richard Lydekker